Francisco Bolota (born April 20, 1946) is a Portuguese former footballer who played as a forward.

Career 
Bolota joined the youth ranks of GD Alcochetense in 1964. In 1967, he played in the Primeira Divisão with F.C. Barreirense for two seasons. Later he joined C.D. Montijo and played in the Segunda Divisão Portuguesa. In 1971, he returned to the top flight with União de Tomar for five seasons, and returned to former team C.D. Montijo for the 1976-77 season. In 1977, he played abroad in the National Soccer League with Toronto Italia. In his debut season in Toronto he recorded 27 goals in 15 matches.

In 1978, he played in the North American Soccer League with Rochester Lancers. He played with Toronto First Portuguese for the 1979 NSL season. The following season he returned to former team Montijo in the  Segunda Divisão Portuguesa. He later had a stint with Juventude Sport Clube, and Lusitano G.C. He concluded his career in Portugal with former teams União de Tomar, and Montijo. In 1986, he returned to play in the National Soccer League with Toronto First Portuguese.

In 1985, he permanently settled in Canada and found employment as a construction worker.

References 

1946 births
Living people
People from Alcochete
Portuguese footballers
F.C. Barreirense players
C.D. Montijo players
U.F.C.I. Tomar players
Toronto Italia players
Rochester Lancers (1967–1980) players
Juventude Sport Clube players
Lusitano G.C. players
Primeira Liga players
Segunda Divisão players
Canadian National Soccer League players
North American Soccer League (1968–1984) players
Association football forwards
Toronto First Portuguese players
Sportspeople from Setúbal District